Zhitang Town is an urban town in Chaling County, Hunan Province, People's Republic of China.

Cityscape
The town is divided into 17 villages and 1 community, the following areas: Pengjiaci Community, Ankengci Village, Xiaotang Village, Hehu Village, Tianhu Village, Dongshou Village, Mashou Village, Jichuan Village, Xinjiang Village, Huangtu Village, Shilong Village, Shilong Village, Pitang Village, Xiaotian Village, Xihu Village, Jinhu Village, Taihu Village, Dongkeng Village, and Huangcao Village.

References

External links

Divisions of Chaling County